Eucalyptus depauperata is a species of mallee that is endemic to the south-west of Western Australia. It has spindly stems with smooth bark, linear to narrow elliptic adult leaves, flower buds in groups of seven, usually lemon-yellow flowers and conical to cup-shaped fruit. It is most common near Lake King.

Description
The bark is smooth and pale grey to salmon-brown in colour. Flowering occurs from September to November and the flowers are lemon-yellow, or sometimes pink-red.

Taxonomy and naming
Eucalyptus depauperata was first formally described by the botanists Lawrie Johnson and Ken Hill in 1992 in the journal Telopea. The type specimen was collected by Hill in 1988 near Lake King. The specific epithet (depauperata) is a mediaeval Latin word meaning "made poor", referring to the small habit, buds and fruits on this species.

This species is part of the Eucalyptus subgenus Symphyomyrtus in the section Bisectae and the subsection Glandulosae. It is closely related to E. eremophila, E. incerata and E. tenera.

Distribution and habitat
This mallee is found on sandplains and lateritic breakaways in the southern Wheatbelt and Goldfields-Esperance regions of Western Australia.
Its range extends from the southern wheatbelt, with large numbers around Lake King extending south-east to around Munglinup.

Conservation status
Eucalyptus depauperata is classified as "not threatened" by the Western Australian Government Department of Parks and Wildlife.

See also
List of Eucalyptus species

References

depauperata
Endemic flora of Western Australia
Mallees (habit)
Myrtales of Australia
Eucalypts of Western Australia
Trees of Australia
Plants described in 1992
Taxa named by Lawrence Alexander Sidney Johnson
Taxa named by Ken Hill (botanist)